So Phisai is a district (amphoe) of Bueng Kan province, northeastern Thailand.

History
The minor district (king amphoe) So Phisai was established on 1 March 1972, when the three tambons So, Si Chomphu, and Nong Phan Tha were split off from Phon Phisai district. It was upgraded to a full district on 13 April 1977.

Geography
Neighboring districts are (from the west clockwise): Fao Rai and Rattanawapi of Nong Khai province; Pak Khat, Mueang Bueng Kan, and Phon Charoen of Bueng Kan Province; and Ban Muang of Sakon Nakhon province.

Administration
The district is divided into seven sub-districts (tambons), which are further subdivided into 89 villages (mubans). So Phisai is a sub-district municipality (thesaban tambon) which covers parts of tambon So. There are a further seven tambon administrative organizations (TAO).

References

External links
amphoe.com

 
Districts of Bueng Kan province